The Regional Civil Service Development Institute is the agency of the Directorate-General of Personnel Administration of the Executive Yuan of the Taiwan (ROC) responsible for the training of local public servants.

History
The institute was originally established in July 1956 as Taiwan Province Training Corps in Taipei. In May 1997, it was renamed to Department of Civil Human Resources, Training and Development and moved to Zhongxing New Village, Nantou City, Nantou County. In July 1999, it was finally renamed as Regional Civil Service Development Institute.

Organizational structure
 Education and Development Division
 Counseling and Extension Division
 eLearning Division
 Secretariat Office
 Personnel Office
 Accounting Office

See also
Directorate-General of Personnel Administration

References

External links
 

Executive Yuan
1956 establishments in Taiwan